Herbert Reed may refer to:
 Herbert Farrant Reed (1865–1911), English cricketer
 Sir Herbert Stanley Reed (1872–1969), British politician
 Herbert C. Reed (fl. 1908–1910), American football coach
 H. Owen Reed (1910–2014), American composer, conductor and author
 Herbert Reed (British Army soldier) (1911–1940), British recipient of the George Cross

See also
 Herbert Read (disambiguation)
 Herbert Taylor Reade (1828–1897), Canadian recipient of the Victoria Cross
 Bert Reed (born 1988), American football wide receiver
 Bert Reid (disambiguation)